Marlene is a German feminine given name. It is derived from Maria combined with Magdalene. It was popularized by actress and singer Marlene Dietrich.

Notable people

Politics
Marlene Catterall, Canadian Member of Parliament 1988-2005
Marlene Cowling, Canadian Member of Parliament 1993-1997
Marlene Graham, member of the Legislative Assembly of Alberta 1997-2004
Marlene Jennings, Canadian Member of Parliament, 1997-2011
Marlene Johnson, Lieutenant Governor of Minnesota 1983-1991
Marlene Lenz, German Member of the Bundestag and Member of the European Parliament

Academia
Marlene Belfort, who helped discover self-splicing introns in bacteriophage DNA
Marlene Dobkin de Rios (1939-2012), American cultural anthropologist, medical anthropologist, and psychotherapist
Marlene Scardamalia, education researcher
Marlene Zuk, evolutionary biologist

Sports
Marlene Hagge
Marlene Ahrens
Marlene Elejarde
Marlene Gerson (born 1940), South African tennis player
Marlène Harnois (born 1986), French taekwondo practitioner
Marlene Matthews
Marlene Slebsager, Danish cricketer
Marlene Streit
Marlene Weingärtner, tennis player
Marlene Thomsen, Danish badminton player

Entertainment
Marlene Daudén, Filipina drama actress
Marlene Dietrich, German actress and entertainer
Marlene Warfield, American actress
Marlene Callahan, also known as Marlene Wallace
Marlene Charell, German entertainer
Marlene Enright, Irish singer
Marlene Janssen, American model
Marlène Jobert, French actress
Marlene Morreis, Austrian actress
Marlene Morrow, American model
Marlene Schmidt, Miss Universe in 1961
Marlene van Niekerk, writer
Marlene Favela, Mexican actress

Arts
Marlene Neubauer-Woerner, German sculptor 
Marlene Dumas, South African painter

Others
Marlene (Burmese businesswoman), also known as Nang Kham Noung
Marlene Lehnberg, also known as The Scissor Murderess
Marlene Garcia-Esperat, murdered journalist

Fictional characters
Marlene (Final Fantasy VII)
Marlene, from The Last of Us videogame series
Marlene Alraune, of the Marvel Universe
Marlene Griggs-Knope, from American comedy series Parks and Recreation
Marlene Kratz, from Australian soap opera Neighbours
Marlene Rush, from the Robotech Series
Marlene the otter, character in the animated TV show The Penguins of Madagascar
Marlene McKinnon, character in J.K. Rowling's Harry Potter series
Marlene Boyce, character in Only Fools and Horses and The Green Green Grass

See also
Marleen

References 

English given names
English feminine given names
German feminine given names